Clyde Edwards is a retired Barbadian sprinter who specialized in the 400 metres.

He became Central American and Caribbean junior champion in 1976.

At the 1984 Olympic Games he finished seventh in the 4 x 400 metres relay, together with teammates Richard Louis, David Peltier and Elvis Forde. Their time of 3:01.60 minutes is still the Barbadian record. Edwards also competed in the 4 x 100 metres relay at the 1984 Olympics.

Achievements

References

1950s births
Living people
Barbadian male sprinters
Athletes (track and field) at the 1978 Commonwealth Games
Commonwealth Games competitors for Barbados
Athletes (track and field) at the 1979 Pan American Games
Pan American Games competitors for Barbados
Athletes (track and field) at the 1984 Summer Olympics
Olympic athletes of Barbados